Cristian Matías Vázquez (born 11 November 1998) is an Argentine professional footballer who plays as a midfielder for Deportivo Español.

Career
Vázquez's career got underway in Primera B Metropolitana with Deportivo Español. He made his professional debut in June 2017 during a 2–0 victory over Barracas Central, in what was his sole appearance in the 2016–17 season. Four appearances followed in 2017–18, prior to the midfielder appearing twenty-seven times in 2018–19 as they were relegated to Primera C Metropolitana.

Career statistics
.

References

External links

1998 births
Living people
Footballers from Buenos Aires
Argentine footballers
Association football midfielders
Primera B Metropolitana players
Deportivo Español footballers